Józef Wojciech Gołuchowski (1797 – 22 November 1858) was a Polish philosopher.

Gołuchowski, a professor at Vilnius University, was co-creator of the Polish Romanticist "national philosophy."  He preached the concept of the nation as a creation of God, with a peculiar "national spirit," that realized the ideal of a hierarchical society in which each individual is a necessary fragment of the whole.  He opposed 18th-century materialist philosophy from an irrationalist position. In the theory of knowledge, he preached the primacy of feeling and intuition over reason.

See also
History of philosophy in Poland
List of Poles

References

1797 births
1858 deaths
19th-century Polish philosophers
Academic staff of Vilnius University

Polish messianism